Pheba is a census-designated place and unincorporated community located in Clay County, Mississippi, United States.

Although an unincorporated community, Pheba has a post office and a zip code of 39755.

History
Pheba was named for Mrs. Pheba Robinson. The community is located on the former Southern Railway and was incorporated in 1890.

A post office first began operation under the name Pheba in 1890.

In 2000, Pheba was the site of the first sporting event in which an all-black team participated in a contest sanctioned by the Mississippi Private School Association (MPSA), which was founded as an organization for segregation academies that originally existed to avoid integration of whites and blacks in public schools when Hebron Christian played against the all-black Christ Missionary and Industrial College High School (CM&I). CM&I had previously not played football for decades and fielded a team of only 14 players.

It was first named as a CDP in the 2020 Census which listed a population of 160.

Demographics

2020 census

Note: the US Census treats Hispanic/Latino as an ethnic category. This table excludes Latinos from the racial categories and assigns them to a separate category. Hispanics/Latinos can be of any race.

Notable person
 William "Billy" Jefferson, NFL football player was born in Pheba.

References

Unincorporated communities in Clay County, Mississippi
Unincorporated communities in Mississippi
Census-designated places in Clay County, Mississippi